Simon Geller (1919/1920 - 1995) was an American classical music station radio personality who ran a one-man radio station in Gloucester, Massachusetts.

Radio career 

Geller was a radio engineer before starting his own station. The station, WVCA-FM ran thirteen hours a day, seven days a week, and was operated out of Geller's apartment. He was known for his eccentric style, which included taking bathroom breaks during live broadcasts, shutting down the station to run errands, and his frequent on-air diatribes, often aimed at the FCC.

Legal battles over license 

In 1982 the U.S. Federal Communications Commission (FCC) voted not to renew Geller's operating license because he did not meet requirements for broadcasting non-entertainment programming and ascertaining community needs. The license was awarded to the Grandbanke Corporation, which had been challenging Geller's license since 1974. In 1984 a Federal Court of Appeals ordered the FCC to reconsider its ruling, citing "serious First Amendment concerns" and concerns over the FCC departing "from its own precendents" in comparing competitors for the license. In 1985 Geller's license was renewed.

Later life 

In 1988 Geller retired from radio, selling his station for $1 million. At that time he had 90,000 listeners. After retiring Geller moved to the Upper West Side of New York City, where health issues kept him essentially isolated in his home.

In 1990 a short film, Radio Fishtown, directed by Henry Ferrini, was made about Geller's life and career.

References 
 

Radio personalities from Massachusetts
20th-century births
1995 deaths
People from Gloucester, Massachusetts
Year of birth uncertain